St. Joseph's is a historic church of the Roman Catholic Archdiocese of Chicago located in Chicago, Illinois at 4821 South Hermitage Avenue. Founded in 1887 with the current church building dating to 1914, Saint Joseph's is a prime example of the Polish Cathedral style of churches in both its opulence and grand scale.  Along with St. John of God and Holy Cross, it is one of three monumental religious edifices that dominates the skyline of the Back of the Yards neighborhood. The parish survived archdiocesan budget cuts in 1990, and, in 2021, was merged with several local churches into a single parish. Today, St. Joseph serves a multicultural community.

History

Initially a mission of St. Mary of Perpetual Help, St. Joseph's was organized in 1887 as the first Polish parish in the Back of the Yards. Its patron saint proved very appropriate as the parish long served a congregation of immigrant workers near the Union Stockyards. In the beginning of the 20th century, the Polish population in the Back of the Yards increased so greatly that two other Polish parishes were formed from St. Joseph's parish—St. John of God, in 1906, and Sacred Heart, in 1910. Like most of the Poles who settled in Chicago's Southwest Side, many of the first parishioners of St. Joseph's were Gorals, or Polish Highlanders, from the Carpathian Mountains. In 1914, the current church building was officially dedicated. In the early 1950s, the church was redecorated by artist John A. Mallin. Although the Union Stockyards, a major employer in the area, closed in the early 1970s and some Polish immigrants subsequently left Back of the Yards, St. Joseph's still celebrates mass in Polish.

In 1990, St. Joseph was one of four Back of the Yards parishes to survive diocesan budget cuts. The others - Sacred Heart of Jesus at 4600 South Honore Street, St. Rose of Lima Church at 1456 West 48th Street, Sts. Cyril and Methodius at 5009 South Hermitage, and St. Augustine Church at 5045 South Laflin, closed that year. In 1996, restoration works at St. Joseph's were initiated. The following year, the status of shrine was given to St. Joseph Church. In 1998, the Shrine of Saint Joseph, Patron of Family Life, was officially dedicated. In 2000, St. Joseph's restoration was completed, and on June 4 of that year, the Shrine of Saint Joseph was rededicated.

St. Joseph celebrated its 125th anniversary with a Mass and celebration on September 1, 2012. In 2015, the parish received a relic of Pope John Paul II, recognised as a saint by the Catholic Church. For many years, a dirt lot occupied the spot where a convent once stood. In August 2015, when the new St. Joseph Plaza, adorned with a paver stone rosary, was inaugurated in its place. Two years later, on March 19, 2017, the parish received a relic of Saint Joseph. In October 2017, the parish celebrated its 130th anniversary. To commemorate the event, a procession involving three religious images of the Virgin Mary - Our Lady of Zapopan, Our Lady of Talpa, and Our Lady of San Juan de los Lagos - was held. Other events, including a peace walk and an outdoor mass, were held to mark the occasion. On February 10, 2019, the formal installation mass for the church's current pastor was held. In 2021, the church was united with two nearby parishes, St. Michael and Holy Cross - Immaculate Heart of Mary, into Holy Cross and SS. Mary, Joseph, and Michael Parish as part of an archdiocesan Renew My Church planning process.

St. Joseph's today 
In 2012, Saint Joseph's parishioners were 75% Mexican-American, with the remaining 25% consisting of Americans, Polish-Americans, and African-Americans. St. Joseph's offers mass every day of the week, with services in Polish, English, and Spanish.

Mass Schedule 
This is a schedule listing the services held at St. Joseph Church as of Summer 2020. All times listed are local.

Architecture
The initial church structure is now Saint John Paul II Hall. The current Baroque church was designed by Joseph Molitor in 1914 with a seating capacity of 1,200. Molitor also created the plans for two neighboring Roman Catholic churches in the Back of the Yards neighborhood of Chicago founded by Eastern European immigrants—Holy Cross Church which served a Lithuanian congregation and the now-closed Sts. Cyril and Methodius Church, constructed by a Bohemian congregation.

St. Joseph's in architecture books

Books on Chicago architecture

Books on church architecture

See also
Polish Cathedral style churches of Chicago
Polish Americans
Poles in Chicago
Roman Catholicism in Poland

References

External links
 Archdiocese of Chicago
 St. Joseph Church History

Religious organizations established in 1887
Roman Catholic churches completed in 1914
20th-century Roman Catholic church buildings in the United States
JosephsChurch NewCity
JosephsChurch NewCity
Polish Cathedral style architecture
19th-century Roman Catholic church buildings in the United States
1887 establishments in Illinois